Oakwood Independent School District is a public school district based in Oakwood, Texas (USA).

The district has two campuses - Oakwood High (Grades 6-12) and Oakwood Elementary (Grades K-5).

Academic achievement
In 2009, the school district was rated "academically acceptable" by the Texas Education Agency.

Special programs

Athletics
Oakwood High School plays six-man football.

See also

List of school districts in Texas

References

External links
Oakwood ISD

School districts in Leon County, Texas
School districts in Freestone County, Texas